Let It Be Christmas is the eleventh studio album and the second Christmas album by American country music artist Alan Jackson. Unlike his first album of Christmas music (1993's Honky Tonk Christmas), this one is composed mainly of renditions of traditional Christmas music. The title track, one of two Christmas songs composed by Jackson, was a Top 40 hit for Jackson on the Hot Country Songs charts.

Track listing
"Have Yourself a Merry Little Christmas" (Ralph Blane, Hugh Martin) – 2:58
"Winter Wonderland" (Felix Bernard, Dick Smith) – 2:18
"O Come All Ye Faithful" (Frederick Oakeley, John Francis Wade) – 3:18
"Santa Claus Is Coming to Town" (J. Fred Coots, Haven Gillespie) – 2:42
"The Christmas Song" (Mel Tormé, Robert Wells) – 3:52
"Silent Night" (Franz Gruber, Joseph Mohr) – 3:47
"Let It Be Christmas" (Alan Jackson) – 4:11
"Jingle Bells" (J. S. Pierpont) – 2:50
"White Christmas" (Irving Berlin) – 3:19
"Silver Bells" (Ray Evans, Jay Livingston) – 3:36
"Away in a Manger" (James Ramsey Murray, John Thomas McFarland) – 2:49

Personnel
 Eddie Bayers - drums
 Bill Elliott - conductor, horn arrangements, string arrangements, vocal arrangements
 Mark Fain - acoustic guitar
 Erica Goodman - harp
 Lloyd Green - pedal steel guitar
 Karen Harper - background vocals
 Alan Jackson - lead vocals
 The Kid Connection - background vocals
 Matthew McCauley - conductor, string arrangements
 Brent Mason - electric guitar
 Cassie Miller - background vocals
 Bobbi Page - background vocals
 Matt Rollings - piano
 Bruce Watkins - acoustic guitar
 Glenn Worf - bass guitar

Chart performance
Let It Be Christmas peaked at #27 on the U.S. Billboard 200, and peaked at #6 on the Top Country Albums. In January 2003, Let It Be Christmas was certified Gold by the RIAA.

Weekly charts

Year-end charts

Sales and Certifications

References

2002 Christmas albums
Alan Jackson albums
Arista Records Christmas albums
Christmas albums by American artists
Country Christmas albums
Albums produced by Keith Stegall